Robert Darcy, 4th Earl of Holderness,  (17 May 1718 – 16 May 1778), known before 1721 as Lord Darcy and Conyers, was a British diplomat and politician.

Career
In 1741 he collaborated with G.F. Handel in the production of Deidamia. From 1744 to 1746 he was ambassador at Venice and from 1749 to 1751 he represented his country at The Hague. In 1751 he became Secretary of State for the Southern Department, transferring in 1754 to the Northern Department, and he remained in office until March 1761, when he was dismissed by King George III in favour of Lord Bute, although he had largely been a cipher in that position to the stronger personalities of his colleagues, successively the Duke of Newcastle, Thomas Robinson, Henry Fox, and William Pitt the Elder. From 1771 to 1776 he acted as governor to two of the King's sons, a solemn phantom as Horace Walpole calls him. He left no sons who survived childhood, and all his titles became extinct except the Baronies of Darcy de Knayth and Conyers, which were baronies by writ inherited from his father, and the Portuguese countship of Mértola, inherited from his mother. In those peerages, he was succeeded by his daughter, Amelia Osborne, Marchioness of Carmarthen.

David Hume wrote, "It is remarkable that this family of d'Arcy [sic] seems to be the only male descendant of any of the Conqueror's barons now remaining among the Peers. Lord Holdernessae [sic] is the heir of that family".

Family
He was the only surviving son of Robert Darcy, 3rd Earl of Holderness, and his wife Lady Frederica Schomberg. On 29 October 1743, Darcy married Mary Doublet, daughter of Francis Doublet and Constantia Van-der-Beck. The couple had three children, only one of whom survived childhood:
George Darcy, Lord Darcy and Conyers (September 1745 – 27 September 1747)
Thomas Darcy, Lord Darcy and Conyers (born and died 1750), buried 29 July 1750 in the Great or St. James Church in The Hague, the Netherlands
Lady Amelia Darcy (12 October 1754 – 27 January 1784); married firstly Francis Osborne, Marquess of Carmarthen, and had issue. The couple divorced in 1779. She married secondly John "Mad Jack" Byron, father of Lord Byron, and had one daughter, Augusta Leigh.

See also
 Great Britain in the Seven Years War

References

External links

|-

|-

1718 births
1778 deaths
British Secretaries of State
Secretaries of State for the Northern Department
Darcy, Robert
Diplomatic peers
Earls of Holderness
Lord-Lieutenants of the North Riding of Yorkshire
Lords Warden of the Cinque Ports
Members of the Privy Council of Great Britain
Ambassadors of Great Britain to the Netherlands
Ambassadors of Great Britain to the Republic of Venice
18th-century British politicians
Barons Darcy de Knayth
Barons Conyers